The Hayatabad Medical Complex is a large medical complex and hospital located in the Hayatabad suburb of Peshawar in Khyber Pakhtunkhwa, Pakistan. The second largest hospital in the city, it is a medical postgraduate training centre. The hospital provides medical and surgical specialties in the fields of optometry, cardiology, paediatrics, physiotherapy, plastic surgery, psychiatry, as well as dentistry and skin treatment. Apart from the western parts of Peshawar, the hospital also serves patients coming from surrounding regions and neighboring Afghanistan for treatment.

See also
 List of hospitals in Pakistan
 Lady Reading Hospital Peshawar
 Khyber Teaching Hospital Peshawar

References

Hospitals in Peshawar
Hospitals established in 2006
2006 establishments in Pakistan
Hayatabad